The 1985 Los Angeles Dodgers won the National League West before losing to the St. Louis Cardinals in the National League Championship Series. Fernando Valenzuela set a major league record for most consecutive innings at the start of a season without allowing an earned run (41).

Offseason
February 4, 1985: Acquired Al Oliver from the Philadelphia Phillies for Pat Zachry

Regular season

Game log

|-bgcolor="#fcc"
| 1 || April 9 || @ Astros
| 1–2
|Ryan (1–0)
| Valenzuela (0–1)
|DiPino (1)
| 42,876
| 0–1
|
|-bgcolor="#cfc"
| 2 || April 10 || @ Astros
| 5–4
| Reuss (1–0)
|Niekro (0–1)
| Howe (1)
| 9,945
| 1–1
|
|-bgcolor="#cfc"
| 3 || April 11 || @ Astros
| 4–3
| Diaz (1–0)
|Dawley (0–1)
| Howell (1)
| 5,793
| 2–1
|
|-bgcolor="#fcc"
| 4 || April 12 || Giants
| 1–4
|Krukow (1–0)
| Honeycutt (0–1)
|
| 46,910
| 2–2
|
|-bgcolor="#cfc"
| 5 || April 13 || Giants
| 1–0
| Valenzuela (1–1)
|Davis (0–1)
|
| 49,861
| 3–2
|
|-bgcolor="#fcc"
| 6 || April 14 || Giants
| 4–8
|Gott (1–0)
| Reuss (1–1)
|Garrelts (1)
| 48,995
| 3–3
|
|-bgcolor="#cfc"
| 7 || April 15 || Astros
| 5–3
| Diaz (2–0)
|Niekro (0–2)
| Howell (2)
| 26,541
| 4–3
|
|-bgcolor="#fcc"
| 8 || April 16 || Astros
| 3–7
|Smith (2–0)
| Howe (0–1)
|
| 32,155
| 4–4
|
|-bgcolor="#cfc"
| 9 || April 17 || Astros
| 1–0 (11)
| Hershiser (1–0)
|DiPino (0–1)
|
| 29,789
| 5–4
|
|-bgcolor="#cfc"
| 10 || April 18 || @ Padres
| 5–0
| Valenzuela (2–1)
|Thurmond (0–1)
|
| 38,024
| 6–4
|
|-bgcolor="#fcc"
| 11 || April 19 || @ Padres
| 2–11
|Hoyt (1–1)
| Reuss (1–2)
|
| 32,920
| 6–5
|
|-bgcolor="#fcc"
| 12 || April 20 || @ Padres
| 3–4 (10)
|Gossage (1–0)
| Howell (0–1)
|
| 42,003
| 6–6
|
|-bgcolor="#cfc"
| 13 || April 21 || @ Padres
| 2–0
| Hershiser (2–0)
|Dravecky (0–1)
|
| 42,574
| 7–6
|
|-bgcolor="#cfc"
| 14 || April 22 || @ Giants
| 3–2 (10)
| Niedenfuer (1–0)
| LaPoint (0–3)
|
| 24,512
| 8–6
|
|-bgcolor="#fcc"
| 15 || April 23 || @ Giants
| 1–2
| Krukow (2–0)
| Valenzuela (2–2)
|
| 19,022
| 8–7
|
|-bgcolor="#cfc"
| 16 || April 24 || @ Giants
| 4–2
| Brennan (1–0)
| Laskey (0–2)
| Howell (3)
| 19,891
| 9–7
|
|-bgcolor="#cfc"
| 17 || April 25 || Padres
| 6–3
| Honeycutt (1–1)
| Show (2–1)
|
| 39,593
| 10–7
|
|-bgcolor="#cfc"
| 18 || April 26 || Padres
| 2–0
| Hershiser (3–0)
| Dravecky (0–2)
|
| 50,335
| 11–7
|
|-bgcolor="#fcc"
| 19 || April 27 || Padres
| 3–4
| Hawkins (4–0)
| Brennan (1–1)
| Gossage (4)
| 49,801
| 11–8
|
|-bgcolor="#fcc"
| 20 || April 28 || Padres
| 0–1
| Lefferts (1–0)
| Valenzuela (2–3)
| Gossage (5)
| 48,726
| 11–9
|
|-bgcolor="#fcc"
| 21 || April 30 || @ Cardinals
| 1–6
| Andujar (4–0)
| Reuss (1–3)
|
| 20,380
| 11–10
|
|-

|-
| 22 || May 1 || @ Cardinals
|-
| 23 || May 3 || @ Pirates
|-
| 24 || May 4 || @ Pirates
|-
| 25 || May 5 || @ Pirates
|-
| 26 || May 6 || @ Cubs
|-
| 27 || May 7 || @ Cubs
|-
| 28 || May 8 || Cardinals
|-
| 29 || May 9 || Cardinals
|-
| 30 || May 10 || Pirates
|-
| 31 || May 11 || Pirates
|-
| 32 || May 12 || Pirates
|-
| 33 || May 14 || Cubs
|-
| 34 || May 15 || Cubs
|-
| 35 || May 17 || @ Phillies
|-
| 36 || May 18 || @ Phillies
|-
| 37 || May 19 || @ Phillies
|-
| 38 || May 20 || @ Expos
|-
| 39 || May 21 || @ Expos
|-
| 40 || May 22 || @ Expos
|-
| 41 || May 24 || @ Mets
|-
| 42 || May 25 || @ Mets
|-
| 43 || May 26 || @ Mets
|-
| 44 || May 27 || @ Mets
|-
| 45 || May 29 || Phillies
|-
| 46 || May 30 || Phillies
|-
| 47 || May 31 || Expos
|-

|-
| 48 || June 1 || Expos
|-
| 49 || June 2 || Expos
|-
| 50 || June 3 || Mets
|-
| 51 || June 4 || Mets
|-
| 52 || June 5 || Mets
|-
| 53 || June 7 || @ Braves
|-
| 54 || June 8 || @ Braves
|-
| 55 || June 9 || @ Braves
|-
| 56 || June 10 || @ Reds
|-
| 57 || June 14 || @ Astros
|-
| 58 || June 15 || @ Astros
|-
| 59 || June 16 || @ Astros
|-
| 60 || June 17 || Padres
|-
| 61 || June 18 || Padres
|-
| 62 || June 19 || Padres
|-
| 63 || June 21 || Astros
|-
| 64 || June 22 || Astros
|-
| 65 || June 23 || Astros
|-
| 66 || June 24 || Astros
|-
| 67 || June 25 || @ Padres
|-
| 68 || June 26 || @ Padres
|-
| 69 || June 27 || @ Padres
|-
| 70 || June 28 || Braves
|-
| 71 || June 29 || Braves
|-
| 72 || June 30 || Braves
|-

|-
| 73 || July 1 || Reds
|-
| 74 || July 2 || Reds
|-
| 75 || July 4 || @ Cardinals
|-
| 76 || July 5 || @ Cardinals
|-
| 77 || July 6 || @ Cardinals
|-
| 78 || July 7 || @ Cardinals
|-
| 79 || July 8 || @ Pirates
|-
| 80 || July 9 || @ Pirates
|-
| 81 || July 10 || @ Pirates
|-
| 82 || July 11 || @ Cubs
|-
| 83 || July 12 || @ Cubs
|-
| 84 || July 13 || @ Cubs
|-
| 85 || July 14 || @ Cubs
|-
| 86 || July 18 || Cardinals
|-
| 87 || July 19 || Cardinals
|-
| 88 || July 20 || Cardinals
|-
| 89 || July 21 || Cardinals
|-
| 90 || July 22 || Pirates
|-
| 91 || July 23 || Pirates
|-
| 92 || July 24 || Pirates
|-
| 93 || July 25 || Cubs
|-
| 94 || July 26 || Cubs
|-
| 95 || July 27 || Cubs
|-
| 96 || July 28 || Cubs
|-
| 97 || July 29 || Giants
|-
| 98 || July 30 || Giants
|-
| 99 || July 31 || Giants
|-

|-
| 100 || August 2 || @ Reds
|-
| 101 || August 2 || @ Reds
|-
| 102 || August 3 || @ Reds
|-
| 103 || August 4 || @ Reds
|-
| 104 || August 5 || @ Braves
|-
| 105 || August 8 || Reds
|-
| 106 || August 9 || Reds
|-
| 107 || August 10 || Reds
|-
| 108 || August 11 || Reds
|-
| 109 || August 12 || Braves
|-
| 110 || August 13 || Braves
|-
| 111 || August 14 || Braves
|-
| 112 || August 15 || Braves
|-
| 113 || August 16 || @ Giants
|-
| 114 || August 17 || @ Giants
|-
| 115 || August 18 || @ Giants
|-
| 116 || August 20 || @ Phillies
|-
| 117 || August 21 || @ Phillies
|-
| 118 || August 22 || @ Phillies
|-
| 119 || August 23 || @ Expos
|-
| 120 || August 24 || @ Expos
|-
| 121 || August 25 || @ Expos
|-
| 122 || August 26 || @ Mets
|-
| 123 || August 27 || @ Mets
|-
| 124 || August 29 || Phillies
|-
| 125 || August 29 || Phillies
|-
| 126 || August 31 || Phillies
|-

|-
| 127 || September 1 || Phillies
|-
| 128 || September 2 || Expos
|-
| 129 || September 3 || Expos
|-
| 130 || September 4 || Expos
|-
| 131 || September 6 || Mets
|-
| 132 || September 7 || Mets
|-
| 133 || September 8 || Mets
|-
| 134 || September 9 || @ Braves
|-
| 135 || September 10 || @ Braves
|-
| 136 || September 10 || @ Braves
|-
| 137 || September 11 || @ Braves
|-
| 138 || September 12 || @ Braves
|-
| 139 || September 13 || @ Reds
|-
| 140 || September 13 || @ Reds
|-
| 141 || September 14 || @ Reds
|-
| 142 || September 15 || @ Reds
|-
| 143 || September 16 || @ Padres
|-
| 144 || September 17 || @ Padres
|-
| 145 || September 18 || Astros
|-
| 146 || September 19 || Astros
|-
| 147 || September 20 || @ Giants
|-
| 148 || September 21 || @ Giants
|-
| 149 || September 22 || @ Giants
|-
| 150 || September 23 || @ Astros
|-
| 151 || September 24 || @ Astros
|-
| 152 || September 25 || @ Astros
|-
| 153 || September 27 || Giants
|-
| 154 || September 28 || Giants
|-
| 155 || September 29 || Giants
|-
| 156 || September 30 || Padres
|-

|-
| 157 || October 1 || Padres
|-
| 158 || October 2 || Braves
|-
| 159 || October 3 || Braves
|-
| 160 || October 4 || Reds
|-
| 161 || October 5 || Reds
|-
| 162 || October 6 || Reds
|-

Season standings

Record vs. opponents

Opening day lineup

Roster

Notable Transactions
July 9, 1985: Acquired Len Matuszek from the Toronto Blue Jays for Al Oliver
July 10, 1985: Acquired Enos Cabell from the Houston Astros for Germán Rivera and Rafael Montalvo
July 14, 1985: Henry Rodríguez was signed as an amateur free agent.
August 31, 1985: Acquired Bill Madlock from the Pittsburgh Pirates for R.J. Reynolds, Sid Bream and Cecil Espy

Player stats

Batting

Starters by position
Note: Pos = Position; G = Games played; AB = At bats; H = Hits; Avg. = Batting average; HR = Home runs; RBI = Runs batted in

Other batters
Note: G = Games played; AB = At bats; H = Hits; Avg. = Batting average; HR = Home runs; RBI = Runs batted in

Pitching

Starting pitchers
Note: G = Games pitched; IP = Innings pitched; W = Wins; L = Losses; ERA = Earned run average; SO = Strikeouts

Other pitchers
Note: G = Games pitched; IP = Innings pitched; W = Wins; L = Losses; ERA = Earned run average; SO = Strikeouts

Relief pitchers
Note: G = Games pitched; W = Wins; L = Losses; SV = Saves; ERA = Earned run average; SO = Strikeouts

National League Championship Series 

The Dodgers faced the St. Louis Cardinals in the 1985 NLCS, the first year the championship series was in a "Best of seven" format. Jack Clark hit a 450-foot home run off Dodger closer Tom Niedenfuer to win game six and the NLCS for the Cardinals. With an open base, Dodger manager Tommy Lasorda was second guessed for not walking Clark, the only big power threat in the Cardinal line-up. Niedenfuer also gave up a walk-off home run to Ozzie Smith in game five contributing to Smith winning the NLCS MVP Award.

|-
| 1 || October 9 || Cardinals
|-
| 2 || October 10 || Cardinals
|-
| 3 || October 12 || @ Cardinals
|-
| 4 || October 13 || @ Cardinals
|-
| 5 || October 14 || @ Cardinals
|-
| 6 || October 16 || Cardinals
|-

Game 1
Wednesday, October 9 at Dodger Stadium (Los Angeles)

Game 2
Thursday, October 10 at Dodger Stadium (Los Angeles)

Game 3
Saturday, October 12 at Busch Stadium (St. Louis)

Game 4
Sunday, October 13 at Busch Stadium (St. Louis)

Game 5
Monday, October 14 at Busch Stadium (St. Louis)

Game 6
Wednesday, October 16 at Dodger Stadium (Los Angeles)

1985 awards
1985 Major League Baseball All-Star Game
Pedro Guerrero reserve
Fernando Valenzuela reserve
NL Pitcher of the Month
Fernando Valenzuela (April 1985)
Fernando Valenzuela (July 1985)
NL Player of the Month
Pedro Guerrero (June 1985)
NL Player of the Week
Pedro Guerrero (June 10–16)
Pedro Guerrero (July 22–28)
Mike Marshall (Sep. 9–15)

Farm system

Major League Baseball Draft

The Dodgers drafted 37 players in the June draft and 16 in the January draft. Of those, six players would eventually play in the Major Leagues. They received an extra pick in the 2nd round of the June draft as compensation for losing pitcher Burt Hooton as a free agent.

The first pick in the June draft was outfielder Chris Gwynn from San Diego State. The brother of Hall of Famer Tony Gwynn, he would play 10 seasons in the Majors (7 of them with the Dodgers), primarily as a pinch hitter/backup outfielder. He hit .261 in 599 Major League games. The draft also included outfielder Mike Devereaux (round 5), who was briefly a starter with the Baltimore Orioles in the early 90s but was primarily a reserve, and relief pitcher John Wetteland (2nd round of the January secondary draft) who saved 330 games in 12 seasons (with the Dodgers, Expos, Yankees and Rangers).

References

External links 
1985 Los Angeles Dodgers uniform
Los Angeles Dodgers official web site
Baseball-Reference season page
Baseball Almanac season page

Los Angeles Dodgers seasons
Los Angeles Dodgers
National League West champion seasons
Los